Sandun Fernando (born 5 April 1999) is a Sri Lankan cricketer. He made his Twenty20 debut on 14 January 2020, for Unichela Sports Club in the 2019–20 SLC Twenty20 Tournament.

References

External links
 

1999 births
Living people
Sri Lankan cricketers
Place of birth missing (living people)